Pyeongchang-dong is a dong, neighbourhood of Jongno-gu in Seoul, South Korea.

Sometimes called the "Beverly Hills of Seoul" (a title shared with but more prominently held by the Gangnam District), due to it being a preferred residential location for Korean celebrities, it still remains a common location used in Korean films and television.  It is unusual to most communities in Seoul, in that it is nestled in the Bugak Mountains, being surrounded on almost all sides, having the feeling of a wooded resort-like suburb.  Many multi-story American style homes fill the community, even though being primarily mountainous, with roads as steep as those in San Francisco.

See also 
Administrative divisions of South Korea

References

External links
 Jongno-gu Official site in English
 Jongno-gu Official site
 Status quo of Jongno-gu by administrative dong 
 Pyeongchang-dong Resident office 
 Origin of Pyeongchang-dong name

Neighbourhoods of Jongno-gu